Parnay is a commune in the Cher department in the Centre-Val de Loire region of France.

Geography
The commune is bordered to the east by the river Auron and the canal de Berry.

Population

Sights
 The church of St. Fiacre, dating from the nineteenth century.
 The ruins of a thirteenth-century chateau at Bois-Buart.
 The ruins of a priory.
 Two stone crosses, one listed as a historic site.

See also
Communes of the Cher department

References

External links

Annuaire Mairie website 

Communes of Cher (department)